Nungshit Mapi is a 2015 Indian Meitei language film directed by Ajit Ningthouja, written by Herojit Naoroibam and produced by Reshi Thokchom, presented by DIS Construction Material Pvt. Limited. It stars Kaiku Rajkumar, Bala Hijam and Bonium Thokchom in the lead roles. The film was released on 13 June 2015 at Bhagyachandra Open Air Theatre (BOAT). It was also premiered at Shankar Lal Auditorium, University of Delhi, New Delhi on 25 July 2015.

Cast
 Rajkumar Kaiku as Amuba
 Bala Hijam as Thambal
 Bonium Thokchom as Thouna
 Hamom Sadananda as Amuba's Friend, Fake CBI Officer
 Idhou as MLA
 Rojesh Saikhom as Kengba
 Harish Phu as Chaoba
 Nandakumar Nongmaithem
 Tej Kshetri as Ta Yaima, Fake CBI Officer
 Thoudam Ongbi Modhubala as Mukta
 R.K. Hemabati as MLA's Wife
 Laimayum Gaitri as Silleima
 Santosh as Eigya Borajao
 Longjam Ongbi Lalitabi
 Premjit Naoroibam as MLA's Worker
 Sunny Naoshekpam
 Suresh Melei as Kiyamlikfang
 Chan Heisnam
 Chinglen Thiyam as MLA Y. Tompok
 Takhellambam Lokendra as Chief Minister L. Loken

Reception
khonjel.org wrote about Bala Hijam in Nungshit Mapi, "Nungshit Mapi presents a different side of Bala. Bala is working hard to be the centre of attraction in this upcoming movie. Thambal (Bala) is a married woman struggling for her womanhood. By womanhood, I mean the entitlements on rights for a woman."

Soundtrack
Sorri Senjam composed the soundtrack for the film and Ajit Ningthouja wrote the lyrics. The songs are titled Oihallasi Nungaiba Lamdam and Nungshit Mapi.

References

External links
 
 
 Official Website

2015 films
2010s Meitei-language films